The Portuguese constitutional referendum was held on 19 March 1933. A draft of the Constitution had been published one year before and the public was invited to state any objections in the press. These tended to stay in the realm of generalities and only a handful of people, less than 6,000, voted against the new constitution. With its passage, women were allowed to vote for the first time in Portugal and given a voice in the National Assembly. Secondary education was a requirement for women suffrage, while men needed only to be able to read and write.

According to a dispatch from the British Embassy in Lisbon, prior to the referendum: "Generally speaking, this novel constitution is receiving the marked approval which it deserves. It has a certain Fascist quality in its theory of 'corporations', which is a reversion to medieval from the 18th-century doctrines. But this quality, unsuited to our Anglo-Saxon tradition, is not out of place in a country which has hitherto founded its democracy on a French philosophy and found it unsuited to the national temperament". The British Embassy also pointed out that Portugal's illiteracy made elections difficult and illusory.

The constitutional referendum was held on 19 March 1933. The new constitution was approved by 99.5% of voters, in a referendum in which abstentions were counted as support votes. It institutionalised the Estado Novo one party state led by António de Oliveira Salazar, and provided for a directly elected President and National Assembly with a four-year term.

There have been conflicting accounts of the results of the referendum. Michael Derrick, in 1938, gives 1,292,864 Yes;  6,090 against; 660 spoilt and 30,654 abstentions 30,654. Colonel Clement Egerton, in 1943, provides the same names as Derrick. Peter Fryer and Patricia McGowan Pinheiro state that official figures were 580,376 in favour; 5,406 against and 11,528 abstentions. Hugh Kay provides, in 1970, 719,364 favour; 5,955 against; 488,840 abstentions in a registered electorate of 1,214,159, in line with the results published in the Diário de Notícias of March 20, 1933.

Fryer and McGowan Pinheiro state that the Constitution was railroaded through not letting more than a handful of people vote "no" but the authors do not explain how the potential "no" voters were restrained. What is quite clear is that abstention numbers where high. Hugh Kay points out that abstention might have been due to the fact that voters were presented with a package deal to which they had to say "yes" or "no" with no opportunity to accept one clause and reject the other. 

In this referendum women were allowed to vote for the first time in Portugal. However secondary education was a requirement for women's suffrage, while men needed only to be able to read and write.

Results

Sources

References

External links

Final tabulation of the results of the plebiscite Diário da República

Referendums in Portugal
Portugal
1933 in Portugal
Constitutional referendums
March 1933 events